Filipino martial arts (FMA) refer to ancient and newer modified fighting methods devised in the Philippines. It incorporates elements from both Western and Eastern Martial Arts, the most popular forms of which are known as Arnis, Eskrima, and Kali. The intrinsic need for self-preservation was the genesis of these systems. Throughout the ages, invaders and evolving local conflict imposed new dynamics for combat in the islands now making up the Philippines. The Filipino people developed battle skills as a direct result of an appreciation of their ever-changing circumstances. They learned often out of necessity how to prioritize, allocate and use common resources in combative situations. Filipinos have been heavily influenced by a phenomenon of cultural and linguistic mixture. Some of the specific mechanisms responsible for cultural and martial change extended from phenomena such as war, political and social systems, technology, trade and practicality.

Filipino martial arts have seen an increase in prominence due to several Hollywood movies and the teachings of modern masters such as Venancio "Anciong" Bacon, Dan Inosanto, Roland Dantes, Edgar Sulite, Cacoy Canete, Danny Guba, Mike Inay, Remy Presas, Wilson Pangan Sr. (Grand Master), Ernesto Presas Sr., Doug Marcaida, Ernesto Presas Jr., Carlito A. Lanada, Sr., and Carlos Deleon.

There have been numerous scholarly calls on the inclusion of the many martial arts of the Philippines into the UNESCO Intangible Cultural Heritage Lists. As of 2019, a total of nine elements scattered in eight countries, such as Thailand, Georgia, and Korea, have successfully inscribed their martial arts in the UNESCO list.

History

In the 12th century, martial arts influence from the Indonesian martial arts culture reached the islands.  At this time, the islands also had culture influences from Cambodia and Thailand. A native martial arts called Arnis de Mano started to exist by the 14th century.  Arnis is characterized as sabre play that uses a pair of rattan canes or short wooden canes.  Ancient Filipinos were considered skilled in dagger and the broad-sword before the Spanish colonization of the Philippines.

Silat is another native martial art of the Philippines.  It uses daggers and sabres.  Silat was popular among the royal families of the South and Muslim area of the country.

There are also fighting systems such as Sikaran and Kuntaw.  Kuntaw is considered on the verge of being extinct.  Sikaran is an old style that is popular in the areas around Manila.  The competition of Sikaran involved two teams or individuals in  the area of a rice paddy in the time of dry season.

Today there are said to be almost as many Filipino fighting styles as there are islands in the Philippines. In 1972, the Philippine government included Filipino martial arts into the national sports arena. The Ministry of Education, Culture and Sports also incorporated them into the physical education curriculum for high school and college students. In recent history, Richardson C. Gialogo and Aniano Lota, Jr. helped the Department of Education (DepEd), former Ministry of Education, Culture and Sports, in the promotion of Arnis in the public schools. The Task Force on School Sports (TFSS) headed by Mr. Feliciano Toledo asked Richard Gialogo and Jon Lota to conduct national, regional and provincial seminar-workshops all over the Philippines under the auspices of the Philippine government. This resulted to the inclusion of Arnis in the Palarong Pambansa (National Games) in 2006. The efforts of the two and Senator Miguel Zubiri resulted in Arnis being declared as the National Martial Art and Sport of the Philippines by virtue of Republic Act 9850 which was signed into law in 2009. Knowledge of the Filipino fighting skills is mandatory in the Philippine military and police.

Filipino martial arts are considered the most advanced practical modern blade system in the world and are now a core component of the U.S. Army's Modern Army Combatives program and used by the Russian Spetsnaz (special forces). The Government of India used Filipino martial arts to train their Para (Indian Special Forces) of Indian Army, National Security Guard, MARCOS of Indian Navy and Commandos of Central Armed Police Forces.

Weapons

Filipino martial artists are noted for their ability to fight with weapons or empty hands interchangeably and their ability to turn ordinary household items into lethal weapons. Weapons-training takes precedence because they give an edge in real fights, gears students to psychologically face armed opponents, and any object that can be picked up can be used as a weapon using FMA techniques. Empty hand training techniques are translated from the use of the Daga (dagger) or Baston (stick).

Another thing to note is that the Philippines is a blade culture. The Southern Philippines with the Moros were never really conquered by the Spaniards or the Americans; nor the Northern mountains of Luzon with their feared headhunter tribes so they kept their weapons and their fighting skills. For the more "Christianized" provinces and the towns where citizens had been "disarmed", bolos (a cutting tool similar to the machete) and other knife variants are still commonly used for general work (farming in the provinces, chopping wood, coconuts, controlling talahib (sword grass), which could grow higher than roofs if not cut, etc.) and the occasional bloody fight. Production of these weapons still survives and there are a few who still make some. In the province of Aklan, Talibongs are still being made in the remote areas. Until the 80s, balisong knives were still commonly used in the streets of Manila as general purpose pocket knives much like Swiss army knives or box cutters until new laws on allowable kinds of knives made it illegal to carry them in public without a permit or proof that it was a vital to one's livelihood (e.g. Martial arts instructor, vendor). They're still openly sold in their birthplace of Batangas, in the streets of Quiapo, souvenir shops and martial arts stores, wielded by practitioners and street gangs. Thus, even when fighting systems were outlawed by the Spaniards, Filipinos still maintained their centuries-old relationships with blades and blade fighting techniques that survive from ancient times and are still much alive as they have been adapted and evolved to stay relevant and practical in colonial and modern times.

What separates Filipino Martial Arts from other weapon-based martial arts like Japanese Kendo & Kenjutsu, European Fencing and traditional Chinese Martial arts that teach the usage of classical Chinese weapons is that FMA teaches weapon use that is practical today: how to use and deal with weapons that one can actually encounter in the streets and how to turn ordinary items into improvised weapons. No one walks around with sabers, katanas or jians anymore, but knives, machetes, clubs and clothing, (called Sarongs), are still among commonly encountered weapons on the street and in the field, thus making FMA very practical and geared towards military and street fighting.

Traditional weaponry varies in design, size, weight, materials, and the way these weapons are used. But because of similar techniques Filipinos can use any object and turned into a weapon by a Filipino martial artist as a force multiplier.

Unarmed
 Mano Mano: (From Spanish mano, meaning hand lit. hand to hand) Incorporates punches, kicks, elbows, knees, headbutts, finger-strikes, locks, blocks, grappling and disarming techniques.
Suntukan (also known as Pangamot in the Visayas and "Panantukan" in the USA): General term for hand-based & punching techniques.
Sikaran: Kicking techniques, also a kick-based separate art practiced in Rizal province.
Dumog: Filipino style of grappling. Practiced in Antique in Panay.
Buno: Filipino style of wrestling.
Bultong/Boltong: Native fighting arts with wrestling and slapping from the Igorot people of Northern Luzon.
Yaw-Yan or Sayaw ng Kamatayan: (Dance of Death) Yaw-Yan closely resembles Muay Thai, but differs in the hip-torquing motion as well as the downward-cutting nature of its kicks, and the emphasis on delivering attacks from long range (while Muay Thai focuses more on clinching). The forearm strikes, elbows, punches, dominating palms, and hand movements are empty-hand translations of the bladed weapons. There are 12 "bolo punches" which were patterned from Arnis.

Impact
Baston / Olisi: Short sticks, traditionally crafted from rattan or kamagong
Bangkaw / Tongat: Staff, rod or pole
Dulo-Dulo: Palmstick
Tameng: Shield
Improvised weapons: pens, keychains, keys (push knife grip), umbrellas, rolled-up newspapers/magazines, walking sticks, etc.

Edged
Daga/Cuchillo: Spanish for dagger and knife respectively. Traditional varieties include the gunong, punyal (from Spanish puñal) and barung or barong
Balisong: Butterfly knife
Karambit: Small blade shaped like a tiger claw
Espada: Spanish for "sword". Includes kampilan, ginunting, pinuti and talibong
Itak: Bolo used by Tagalog people
Kalis: Larger, thicker Filipino kris
Golok: Machete or broadsword used by tribes people
Sibat: Spear
Sundang: Single-edged thick short sword
Lagaraw: Single-edged flexible long sword with a bent tip
Ginunting: Single-edged flat ground short sword with a double edged sheep's hoof tip. Typically used in matched pairs with Pinunting
Pinunting: Single edged v-ground short sword with backswept tip. Typically used in matched pairs with Ginunting

Flexible
Latigo: Spanish (sp. látigo) for whip
Buntot Pagi: Stingray tail
Lubid: Rope
Sarong
Cadena / Tanikala: Spanish and Tagalog (Tanikalâ) respectively for chain
Tabak-Toyok: Two sticks attached together by rope or chain, similar to nunchaku, but with shorter sticks and a longer chain
Improvised: Belt, bandana, handkerchief, shirt, towel

Projectile
Pana at Palaso: Bow and arrow
Sibat: Spear
Sumpit: Blowpipe
Bagakay: Darts
Tirador/Pintik/Saltik: Spanish, Cebuano and Tagalog for slingshot respectively. 
Kana (as in Indian Pana Kakana-kana/kakanain kita): Darts propelled by slingshots used by street gangsters
Lantaka: kerosene-propelled bamboo cannon
Luthang: gas-powered mini bamboo cannon

Training

Signs and symbols

The triangle is one of the strongest geometrical structures and stands for strength. Many training halls incorporate the triangle into their logo. It represents numerous underlying philosophical, theoretical and metaphysical principles in the Filipino martial arts. Applications of the triangle are found in defensive and offensive tactical strategies, including footwork, stances, blocking and disarms.

The triangle also represents a trinity of deities. Majority of ethno-linguistic groups in the country are known to have a trinity of ancient gods and goddesses, embodying the number three as sacred.

During training, non-verbal gesture communication and recognition is used in teaching and identification. This sign language, utilizing hand, body and weapons signals; is used to convey ideas, desires, information, or commands.

Basic tactical ranges
The three combat ranges in the Filipino martial arts are corto (Spanish for close-range), medio (Spanish for medium-range) and largo (Spanish for long-range).

Hakbang: general term for footwork
Corto Mano: close range, short movements, minimal extension of arms, legs and weapons, cutting distance
Serrada: "split step", short range footwork, quick, split action, front and back, low stance. Serrada footwork is the base of a triangular framework methodology
Largo Mano: long range, extended movements, full extension of arms, legs and weapons, creating distance
Fraile: short range footwork, hopping action, balanced position, short hop, pushing off from the lead foot
Retirada: short range footwork, shuffling action, pushing backward by pushing off the lead foot, giving six to eight inches of range per action.
Banda y banda: side to side action

Basic tactical methods
Filipino martial arts contain a wide range of tactical concepts, both armed and unarmed. Each art includes several of the methods listed below. Some of these concepts have been taken in isolation to serve as the foundation for entire fighting systems in themselves.

Unarmed tactical methods
 Striking 

Mano Mano, Suntukan, Pangamot, de Cadena, Cadena de Mano, panantukan - empty hands
Suntukan , Panantukan, Dirty Boxing - empty-hand striking (usually with closed fist) with elbows, headbutts and low kicks
 Paa Paahan, Paa- foot; feet; hoof; foot to; feet to; limb; footstool; toes; legs; base; bottom; corners; Paahan-with large feet; 
Sikaran,  kick backward; to kick backward
Pananjakman, Sipa, patid or sikad - low kicks (heel impact point)

 Grappling 

Dumog - wrestling or grappling methods with an emphasis on disabling or controlling the opponent by manipulation of the head and neck. This also refers directly to a wrestling competition on muddy ground.
Buno

 Dirty

Kinamutay - a sub-section of pangamot that specializes in biting and eye-gouging
Pa-ak - biting
Pakug - headbutting
Sablig - throwing natural eye irritants such as sand to the unwary opponent 
Kawras or kamras - scratching attack to sensitive parts such as the eyes

Armed tactical methods
Solo baston - single stick
Doble Baston - double stick
Bati-Bati - butt of stick methods
Dulo-Dulo/Dulo y Dulo - palm stick methods
Bantay-Kamay, Tapi-Tapi-  "guardian hand" or "alive hand", auxiliary weapon used in conjunction with the primary weapon for checking, blocking, monitoring, trapping, locking, disarming, striking, cutting, etc. Examples include the empty hand when using a single stick or the dagger when fighting with sword and dagger
Baraw - knife and dagger
Mano y Daga - hand and dagger
Baston y Daga - stick and dagger
Daga y Daga - pair of daggers
Espada y Daga - sword and dagger
Latigo y Daga - whip and dagger
Tapon-Tapon - hand thrown knives and weapons tactics

Drilling tactical methods
Numerado - striking and blocking by the numbers, refers to the most basic strikes and angles
Cinco Teros - five strikes, refers to the five most basic strikes and counters
Doblete - two-weapon blocking and countering method of doubles
Sinawali - "weaving"; rhythmic, flowing, striking patterns and tactics, utilizing two impact or edged weapons.
Redonda - circular double-stick vertical downward pattern of six strikes
Ocho ocho - repeating pattern, strikes and tactics, such as the figure-eight. This also refers to a dance move.
Palis Palis - meeting force with force
Free flow - live interaction and play, flowing practice, rapid, rhythmic, weapons tactics

Technical tactical methods
Abaniko - fanning techniques
Witik - whipping, snapping back or picking movements
Lobtik - follow-through strikes; horizontal, vertical, diagonal methods
Crossada - cross blocking methods, hands and weapons
Gunting - "scissors"; armed and unarmed scissoring techniques aimed at disabling an opponent's arm or hand
Lock and block - dynamic countering, attacks based on the striking and blocking methods of the system
Kadena De Mano - chain of hands, close quarters, continuous, empty-handed combat
Hubud Lubud - to tie and untie, continuous trapping methods
Trankada - joint locking and breaking techniques
Panganaw - disarming techniques

Other traditional techniques
Balitok - acrobatic flip or back-flip to evade attacks. This can also be used in combination of kicking to hit opponents.
Bikil, sapiti or sapid - hitting an opponent's center of gravity to cause imbalance
Bunal, bangag or puspos - downward striking with a blunt weapon
Bungot sa kanding - a goatee sported by men to supposedly intimidate or distract an opponent.
Busdak - throwing an opponent down to the ground
Dunggab, duslak or luba - stealthy stabbing stroke
Dusmo - to push an opponent's face to the ground
Hapak or sumbag - packed punch aimed to take down an opponent
Hata - fake movement intended to open up opponent's defensive stance
Ku-ot or kumot - stealthy grabbing and grappling of body parts such as hair
Kulata - combo punches to disable or overwhelm an opponent
Laparo or tamparos - slapping using the lower part of the palm
Lihay - evading attacks
Lubag - twisting of joints to unnatural position to disable a physically stronger opponent. This includes a lethal twisting and snapping of the neck.
Luglog - In the Waray language this is to slit the throat
Sagang - blocking of striking attacks
Tigbas - slashing and cutting stroke
Tu-ok - strangling or locking the neck

Other traditional techniques, kinamutay-based
Pa-ak - biting
Pakug - headbutting
Sablig - throwing natural eye irritants such as sand to the unwary opponent 
Kawras or kamras - scratching attack to sensitive parts such as the eyes
Siko - to hit with the elbow

Esoteric practices
Agimat: A talisman worn to protect against misfortune and increase the chance of victory. Also known as habak or anting-anting.
Albularyo: A shaman who carries out the initiation ceremony and treats injuries
Hilot: A traditional system of herbalism, massage and first-aid that was traditionally taught alongside martial arts
Kulam or Barang : Witchcraft or spell-rituals carried out by witch-doctors. Also known as barang in Visayas.
Oracion: Special prayers, incantations or mantra that may be recited before battle as a protective armor. This is also used for driving out or summoning spiritual entities. This is usually written in Latin language.

See also
Arnis/Eskrima/Kali
 Eskrima weapons
Suntukan
Kinamutay
Sikaran
Eskrima in popular culture
Kuntao
Yaw-Yan
Pekiti-Tirsia Kali

References

External links
 FMA Informative- Propagating the Filipino Martial Arts and the Culture of the Philippines 
 
 The FMA-Eskrima-Kali FAQ
 FMATalk Live! - Podcast Dedicated to the Promotion of Filipino Martial Arts

Philippine culture